Herbert Clarence Randle (31 July 1906 – 7 August 1976), known as Harry Randle, was an English footballer who played professionally for clubs including Southend United, Accrington Stanley and Gillingham, for whom he made 110 Football League appearances. Randle was born in Stonebroom and died in Chesterfield.

References

1906 births
1976 deaths
People from Stonebroom
Footballers from Derbyshire
English footballers
Association football midfielders
Mansfield Town F.C. players
Shirebrook Miners Welfare F.C. players
Birmingham City F.C. players
Southend United F.C. players
Accrington Stanley F.C. (1891) players
Gillingham F.C. players
Barrow A.F.C. players
English Football League players